Fukushi (written: 福士) is a Japanese surname. Notable people with the surname include:

 , Japanese physician and pathologist
 , Japanese voice actor
 , Japanese long-distance runner
 , Japanese model
 , Japanese actor
 , Japanese actor

Japanese-language surnames